Alberto Martín Díaz (born 13 September 2001), commonly known as Teto, is a Spanish footballer who plays as a right winger for CD Tenerife.

Club career
Born in Santa Cruz de Tenerife, Canary Islands, Teto joined CD Tenerife's youth setup in 2011, aged nine. He made his senior debut with the reserves on 20 March 2021, coming on as a second-half substitute and scoring his team's second in a 2–0 Tercera División away win over Atlético Unión Güímar.

Teto made his first team debut on 2 December 2021, replacing Emmanuel Apeh in the extra time of a 2–1 away win over CD Ibiza Islas Pitiusas, the season's Copa del Rey. His professional debut occurred the following 13 August, as he replaced Samuel Shashoua late into a 2–1 loss at SD Eibar in the Segunda División.

Teto scored his first professional goal on 19 September 2022, netting his team's third in a 3–1 home win over Málaga CF. On 11 November, after establishing himself as a regular in the first team, he renewed his contract until 2027.

References

External links

2001 births
Living people
Footballers from Santa Cruz de Tenerife
Spanish footballers
Association football wingers
Segunda División players
Tercera División players
Tercera Federación players
CD Tenerife B players
CD Tenerife players